The Ardmore Micropolitan Statistical Area, as defined by the United States Census Bureau, is an area consisting of two counties in South Central Oklahoma, anchored by the city of Ardmore.

As of the 2000 census, the μSA had a population of 54,452 (though a July 1, 2011 estimate placed the population at 57,482).

Counties
Carter
Love

Communities
Places with more than 20,000 inhabitants
Ardmore (Principal city)
Places with 1,000 to 5,000 inhabitants
Dickson 
Healdton
Lone Grove
Marietta
Wilson
Places with 500 to 1,000 inhabitants
Springer
Places with less than 500 inhabitants
Gene Autry
Leon
Ratliff City 
Tatums
Thackerville
Unincorporated places
Burneyville
Courtney
Enville
Greenville
Jimtown
Orr
Overbrook
Rubottom

Demographics
As of the census of 2000, there were 54,452 people, 21,434 households, and 15,205 families residing within the μSA. The racial makeup of the μSA was 78.93% White, 6.72% African American, 7.96% Native American, 0.55% Asian, 0.03% Pacific Islander, 1.53% from other races, and 4.28% from two or more races. Hispanic or Latino of any race were 3.47% of the population.

The median income for a household in the μSA was $30,982, and the median income for a family was $37,471. Males had a median income of $30,021 versus $20,728 for females. The per capita income for the μSA was $16,080.

See also
Oklahoma census statistical areas

References

 
Carter County, Oklahoma
Love County, Oklahoma